The Accomplice, is an 2020 Iranian drama, romance, mystery series produced and directed by Mostafa kiae and written by Mohsen kiae and Ali Kouchaki.

Plot
The story of the series is about an old family in Tehran called Sabouri who has been cultivating decorative flowers and various flowers for many years. The Saburi family consists of three brothers and a sister, all of whom work for the company and follow in their family's inherited occupation. The only son is Fariborz, who is now 58 years old and is an intelligence officer and life story. He wrote himself unaffected by his family. At a young age, Fariborz decides to become a policeman and goes to a city to undergo a training course.

The Sabouri family still lives together in peace in old houses, but the arrival of a young man in this family changes the life of the whole family, which ...

Cast 
 Parviz Parastui
 Hedieh Tehrani
 Mohsen kiae
 Habib Rezaei
 Masoud Rayegan
 Roya Teymourian
 Pedram Sharifi
 Mehdi Pakdel
 Hengameh Ghaziani
 Afsaneh Naseri
 Sogol Khaligh
 Maral Baniadam

Soundtracks

Reception

Awards and nominations

References

External links
 

Iranian drama television series
Islamic Republic of Iran Broadcasting original programming
2010s Iranian television series
Persian-language television shows